Raymond C. Boyd (February 11, 1887 – February 11, 1920) was a professional baseball player.  He was a right-handed pitcher over parts of two seasons (1910–11) with the St. Louis Browns, and Cincinnati Reds.  For his career, he compiled a 2–4 record, with a 3.09 earned run average, and 26 strikeouts in 58⅓ innings pitched.

External links

1887 births
1920 deaths
Deaths from Spanish flu
St. Louis Browns players
Cincinnati Reds players
Major League Baseball pitchers
Baseball players from Indiana
Keokuk Indians players
Burlington Pathfinders players
Ottumwa Packers players
Birmingham Barons players
Chattanooga Lookouts players
Oakland Oaks (baseball) players
Galesburg Hornets players